Assetline Capital is a leading Australian non-bank lender, providing capital with certainty, at market-leading speed for business borrowers. With offices in Sydney and Melbourne, the in-house team of skilled property and finance experts understand complex underlying business or portfolio structures. They'll work with you, as a long-term partner, to develop financial solutions for your clients – from bridging loans and long-term mortgages to construction finance.”

History
Since 2012, Assetline Capital has helped an increasing number of developers, investors and business owners seize opportunities the major banks aren't prepared to fund. Assetline Capital's flat structure gives brokers and clients direct access to decision makers. Applications typically get a response in eight hours, and those that meets its criteria receive funding approvals within 48 hours – and settlement within 48 to 72 hours from receiving valuation. And with products covering Bridging, Construction and now long-term Horizon Mortgages, the lender now offers a full suite of financial solutions to bridge the gap for more clients. Over the past 10 years, the lender has successfully managed over 1,000 deals, valued at more than $1.2 billion. Armed with an experienced leadership team, new products, and additional funding sources strengthening its balance sheet, Assetline Capital is the perfect partner to help you navigate an unpredictable market – and solve your clients’ unmet needs.

See also
 Asset-based lending
 Alternative investment
 Alternative financial services
 Non-bank financial institution

References

 https://assetline.com.au/
 https://www.theadviser.com.au/broker/43572-horizon-mortgages-offers-greater-funding-choice-for-smes-and-smsfs
 https://www.theadviser.com.au/borrower/43575-tips-on-spotting-tailwinds-in-a-property-correction
 https://www.theadviser.com.au/lender/42477-when-you-need-certainty-experience-or-speed-assetline-capital-is-here-to-help/
 https://assetline.com.au/horizon-mortgages/

External links
 

Retail financial services
Australian companies established in 2012
Financial services companies established in 2012
Retail companies established in 2012